State Route 62 (SR 62) is a primary state highway in the U.S. state of Virginia.  Known as Milton Highway, the state highway runs  from the North Carolina state line, where North Carolina Highway 62 (NC 62) continues into Milton, north to U.S. Route 58 (US 58) and US 360 east of Danville.  SR 62 was assigned as a number upgrade of SR 726 to connect US 58 with NC 62 in 1946.

Route description

SR 62 begins at the North Carolina state line in the extreme southwestern corner of Halifax County. The roadway continues southeast as NC 62, which immediately crosses the Dan River into the town of Milton, where NC 62 turns south toward Burlington at its intersection with NC 57. Milton is just south of Virginia International Raceway, which lies on the east side of the Dan River. SR 62 almost immediately enters southeastern Pittsylvania County and remains in the county for the remainder of the route. The roadway continues north as SR 726 (Ringgold Depot Road), which heads northwest toward Ringgold Depot.

History
In the 1930s, present SR 62 was designated as part of State Route 726. SR 62 was transferred to the primary state highway system in 1946, connecting with North Carolina Highway 62 towards Roxboro and Oxford, North Carolina. The State Route 62 designation was already in use on a route in western Virginia; that route was renumbered to State Route 78.

Major intersections

References

External links

Virginia Highways Project: VA 62

062
State Route 062